= Liberty Fork, Virginia =

Unincorporated community in Virginia, United States

Coordinates: 38°02′48″N 77°10′33″W

Liberty Fork is an unincorporated community in Caroline County, in the U.S. state of Virginia.
